Julie Meadows (born Lydia Lee; February 3, 1974) is an American writer, web designer and former pornographic actress, who became a documentarian after retiring from the adult film industry. She was active in the industry from 1998 to 2004 and is sometimes said to resemble the actress Julia Stiles.

Early life and education
Born on February 3, 1974, in Texarkana, Texas, Meadows has three sisters. She married at the age of 17 and gave birth to a son just after their first anniversary.

Career
Meadows met the film director Michael Raven while dancing in Dallas. She moved to Los Angeles, California, six months later, where she began working in adult films in 1998. Her first film was Ed Powers' Dirty Debutantes 94.

Meadows was a contract performer for VCA for two years, before leaving in January 2003. She retired from the adult industry in 2004; she later stated her reason for retiring was that she was no longer interested in making movies.

In March 2010, Meadows appeared in a Public Service Announcement for the Free Speech Coalition on the topic of Internet infringement of adult content, directed by Michael Whiteacre. The spot, entitled the "FSC All-Star Anti-Piracy PSA," found Meadows in the company of adult performers such as Lisa Ann, Kimberly Kane, Ron Jeremy, and Wicked Pictures contract stars Alektra Blue and Kaylani Lei.

On February 14, 2011, Meadows (as Lydia Lee) and producing/directing partner Michael Whiteacre released the first two episodes of their documentary, The Devil And Shelley Lubben, a biographical exposé of anti-pornography crusader Shelley Lubben starring Meadows, Kayden Kross, Nina Hartley, Monica Foster, Melissa Monet and Danny Wylde. She backed out of working on later episodes though.

Awards and nominations

References

External links

 
 
 
 
 
 2002 interview at Adultdvdtalk.com
 January 2000 interview at RogReviews.com
 January 2003 interview at RogReviews.com

1974 births
Living people
People from Texarkana, Texas
American pornographic film actresses
Pornographic film actors from Texas
American women writers
Web designers
21st-century American women